The Silver Lining is the third studio album by alternative metal band Earshot, released on August 26, 2008. It was the band's first album released since Two in 2004, and their first release outside of Warner Bros. Records. It contains just one officially released single, "MisSunderstood."

Track listing
All songs written by Wil Martin.

Personnel
Wil Martin – Vocals/ Guitar
Travis Arnold – Guitar
Scott Kohler – Guitar
Daren Pfeifer – Drums
Billy Blair – Bass

Singles

References

2008 albums
Silver Lining, The